Laelia undulata is a species of orchid native to Colombia, Trinidad and Venezuela.

References

External links 

undulata
Orchids of Colombia
Orchids of Trinidad
Orchids of Venezuela